Nuno Jorge Pereira da Silva Valente  (born 12 September 1974) is a former Portuguese professional footballer who played as a left-back or a winger. He later became a manager.

He played professionally in Portugal and England for Sporting, Portimonense, Marítimo, União de Leiria, Porto and Everton.

Valente represented Portugal at international level, participating at Euro 2004 (where Portugal became runners-up) and the 2006 World Cup.

Club career
Born in Lisbon, Valente began his career at second division club Portimonense on loan from Sporting CP. However, he found first-team chances limited at the former side and despite success in helping win the Portuguese Cup in 1995, he was loaned again in the 1996–97 season to C.S. Marítimo, also in the Primeira Liga.

A young José Mourinho recognized Valente's talent and brought him to U.D. Leiria in the summer of 1999, where he spent three years as an undisputed starter. In 2002, when Mourinho left to join FC Porto, he and teammate Derlei were the club's first signings. The former repaid the coach's faith with some good displays as Porto romped to victory in the national championship and defeated Celtic 3–2 in the UEFA Cup.

The following campaign, Valente helped his club to Portuguese and Champions League wins, with the defender appearing in 11 games during the latter competition's run, ten of those complete. At the season's closure, he renewed his contract until 2007.

After Mourinho signed for Chelsea, Valente picked up a succession of injuries. He only played eight matches in the entire domestic league, but returned in time to face Inter Milan in the Champions League round of 16, not being able to prevent his team losing 2–4 on aggregate.

After another poor year, which included an ultimatum by Porto president Jorge Nuno Pinto da Costa that ordered him to choose between club or national team, eventually leading to a suspension, on 28 August 2005 Valente moved to Everton on a three-year deal worth €2.2 million, under recommendation of mentor Mourinho, after the English had lost regular left-back Alessandro Pistone to injury. He took a while to adapt to the hectic pace of the Premier League, but became a regular from then on – in 2005–06 and 2006–07 he was considered first-choice, but faced stiff competition from Gary Naysmith; in February 2007, the Merseyside club took the option of a one-year extension to his contract, tying him until June of the following year.

In early May 2008, Valente signed another one-year link, but he eventually fell down the pecking order at the Toffees, usually backing Leighton Baines. Furthermore, with centre back Joleon Lescott also being able to play the position and with Valente also suffering from injury problems, he received little playing time during 2008–09, being released on 12 June 2009 and choosing to retire from playing after appearing in 60 competitive games in four seasons.

Upon his retirement, Valente was appointed Everton's official scout in Portugal. After one year, he returned to main club Sporting and joined Paulo Sérgio's coaching staff.

International career
A full Portugal international since after the 2002 FIFA World Cup, Valente was first-choice for the national side during the runner-up campaign at UEFA Euro 2004, played in home soil. During 2005 he suffered a thigh strain, but recovered in time to play in the 2006 World Cup, again playing a key part in their eventual fourth-place finish; in the quarter-final match against England he appeared to handball a David Beckham cross, but Horacio Elizondo did not to award a penalty and his team eventually advanced after a shootout.

After playing only once during the Euro 2008 qualifiers, Valente retired from international football in September 2008.

Coaching career
Valente kickstarted his coaching career on 11 October 2017, replacing Fernando Mira at the helm of C.D. Trofense in the Portuguese third division. Less than two months later, after six official matches and five losses, he was fired.

Personal life
Valente is married to Jennifer McLoughlin, an entrepreneur who owns a clothing boutique named Koobic Clothing. They both reside in Portugal with their daughter. Valente is stepfather to his wife's daughters from a previous relationship.

Career statistics

Club

International goals

|}

Honours
Sporting
Taça de Portugal: 1994–95
Supertaça Cândido de Oliveira: 1995

Porto
Primeira Liga: 2002–03, 2003–04
Taça de Portugal: 2002–03
Supertaça Cândido de Oliveira: 2003, 2004
UEFA Champions League: 2003–04
UEFA Cup: 2002–03
Intercontinental Cup: 2004

Portugal
UEFA European Championship runner-up: 2004

Orders
 Medal of Merit, Order of the Immaculate Conception of Vila Viçosa (House of Braganza)

References

External links

1974 births
Living people
Footballers from Lisbon
Portuguese footballers
Association football defenders
Primeira Liga players
Liga Portugal 2 players
Sporting CP footballers
Portimonense S.C. players
C.S. Marítimo players
U.D. Leiria players
FC Porto players
Premier League players
Everton F.C. players
UEFA Champions League winning players
UEFA Cup winning players
Portugal under-21 international footballers
Portugal international footballers
UEFA Euro 2004 players
2006 FIFA World Cup players
Portuguese expatriate footballers
Expatriate footballers in England
Portuguese expatriate sportspeople in England
Portuguese football managers
C.D. Trofense managers